Aphilanthopini is a tribe of hymenopterans in the family Crabronidae. There are at least 2 genera and about 13 described species in Aphilanthopini.

Genera
These two genera belong to the tribe Aphilanthopini:
 Aphilanthops Patton, 1881 i c g b (ant queen kidnapping wasps)
 Clypeadon Patton, 1897 i c g b
Data sources: i = ITIS, c = Catalogue of Life, g = GBIF, b = Bugguide.net

References

Further reading

 
 
 

Crabronidae